Wendell Ralph Butcher (March 28, 1914 – December 18, 1988) was an American football back who played five seasons with the Brooklyn Dodgers of the National Football League (NFL). He played college football at Gustavus Adolphus College and attended Worthington High School in Worthington, Minnesota.

Early years
Butcher lettered three years in football, two years in basketball and two years in track at Worthington High School. He graduated in 1932. He was inducted into the Worthington High School Athletic Hall of Fame.

College career
Butcher played for the Gustavus Adolphus Golden Gusties. He lettered one year as a halfback and three as a fullback. He helped the Gusties to three straight State Championships while the team won the conference all four years he played for them. Butcher was the leading scorer, rusher and passer in the conference during his junior and senior seasons. He earned All-State honors three times and was named a Little All-American in 1937. He was nicknamed the "Worthington Walloper" during his time at Gustavus Adolphus. Butcher also participated in basketball and track for the Gusties. He graduated in 1938. He was a charter member of the Gustavus Adolphus Athletics Hall of Fame in 1978.

Professional career
Butcher signed with the NFL's Brooklyn Dodgers in 1938. He played in 44 games, starting 17, for the Dodgers from 1938 to 1942.

Personal life
Butcher served in the United States Military during World War II. He worked at the family business, Thermopax, a heating equipment manufacturing company in Memphis, Tennessee, with his two sons. He retired in March 1979. Wendell's son, Ron Butcher, scored the first touchdown in the 1963 Rose Bowl.

References

External links
Just Sports Stats

1914 births
1988 deaths
American football quarterbacks
American football defensive backs
Gustavus Adolphus Golden Gusties football players
Brooklyn Dodgers (NFL) players
College men's basketball players in the United States
Basketball players from Minnesota
College men's track and field athletes in the United States
Players of American football from Minnesota
People from Worthington, Minnesota
American men's basketball players